Schinia rufocostulata is a moth of the family Noctuidae. It is only known from south-western Texas.

External links
Images
Systematics of Schinia chrysellus (Grote) complex: Revised status of Schinia alencis (Harvey) with a description of two new species (Lepidoptera: Noctuidae: Heliothinae)

Schinia
Moths of North America
Moths described in 2005